St. Thomas Seminary, located in Bloomfield, Connecticut, is a minor seminary for the Roman Catholic Archdiocese of Hartford. The current rector is the Most Reverend Christie A. Macaluso.

History
St. Thomas Seminary was founded in 1897 by Bishop Michael Tierney, the sixth Bishop of Hartford. The original Seminary was located at 352 Collins Street in Hartford, in what was once the Chinese College. It opened its doors on September 7, 1897. Bishop Tierney appointed the Right Reverend John Synnott as the first President of St. Thomas. Due to the increasing enrollment it became necessary to find a larger space. Bishop John J. Nilan had the cornerstone laid for the present building in 1928, and in 1930 the seminary moved to its current location in Bloomfield.

Collins Street (1897–1930)
St. Thomas Seminary opened on September 7, 1897, with 37 students in its first class. On the first floor was a study hall, classrooms, the refectory, and parlors. The second floor consisted of the chapel, a dormitory, and the professors' rooms. Soon after the size of the building proved inadequate for the needs of the diocese, and a new building adjacent to the old Chinese College was erected, serving the diocese until 1930.

Bloomfield (1930–present)
On September 30, 1930, St. Thomas opened at its new location in Bloomfield, a suburb of Hartford. The Seminary was designed by architect Louis A. Walsh of Waterbury and built by W. F. O'Neil. During its first 45 years (until 1942), the Seminary for the most part educated only seminarians for the Diocese of Hartford, then from fall of 1942 seminarians began arriving from the Dioceses of Albany, Burlington, and Manchester. The following year, the Dioceses of Portland (Maine) and Springfield (Massachusetts) were added.

Curriculum
The curriculum at St. Thomas at its inception consisted of a five-year program. The classical education consisted of courses in Latin, Greek, and English, as well as systematic training in French and German. Other courses consisted of mathematics, natural sciences, Christian doctrine, and history. The curriculum developed over time and eventually the Seminary became a six-year program, with four years of high school and the first two years of college. Students completing the six-year program would receive the Associate of Arts degree.

Course of studies: 1954–55
Since the 1954-55 Academic Year, the two-year college program consisted of the following courses:

Freshman Year:
Appreciation of Literature, Poetry
Latin Literature, Livy, Tacitus, Horace, Cicero 
Latin Composition
Elementary Greek
French, German or Italian
General Inorganic Chemistry
Religion
Public Speaking
Music
Mathematics
 
Sophomore Year:
Novel, Composition
Latin Literature, Horace, Cicero, St. Augustine, Tacitus
Latin Composition
Advanced Greek
French, German or Italian
Modern European History
Religion
Public Speaking
Physics
Music

Seminary life

Student organizations
Over its history, St. Thomas Seminary had various student organizations which were run by the students and overseen by the faculty.
Stella Matutina:
The Stella Matutina, Latin for Morning Star, was the seminary's quarterly literary magazine produced by the seminarians. It was founded during the Fall Semester in 1917. The first editors of the magazine were Patrick Flynn, Lester Loughran, and Harry O'Brien. Its twofold plan was to foster "the literary inclinations of the undergraduates and of uniting the alumni more closely to their ALMA MATER." The Stella Matutina contained articles by seminarians, as well as poetry. The articles ranged from seminary life to current events, as well as academic papers. Later volumes contained photographs.

Literary and Debating Society:
The Literary and Debating Society produced programs for the student body every month and would also show films.

The King's Masquers:
The King's Masquers was the drama club of the seminary, and produced four plays a year open to the public.

Glee Club:
The non-liturgical choir performed twice a year for the seminarians and the public.

Schola Cantorum:
The chapel choir sang for the special feast day liturgies.

Orchestra:
The orchestra, like the Glee Club, was a non-liturgical group which gave two public performances a year. The orchestra was organized during the 1942-43 school year.

The Printing Club:
The Printing Club was responsible for producing programs for the various school activities. It did not, however, print the Stella Matutina.

The Camera Club:
The Camera Club was responsible for photography of the major seminary events and for the displaying the photographs.

Third Order of St. Francis:
A spiritual club which met every other week.

The Mission Society:
The Mission Society was started at the Seminary in October 1920.

Athletics
Athletics were a large part of the student life of St. Thomas Seminary. Basketball and baseball were among the sports played at the original seminary on Collins Street. Among St. Thomas' biggest rivals was Hartford High School. A Tennis team was started in the Fall of 1924. After moving to its current location in Bloomfield, basketball was briefly dropped due to a lack of facilities. Sports added to replace basketball included ice hockey (1932), bowling (1934), and golf.

St. Thomas also had intramural sports, which included basketball, baseball, handball, tennis, ice hockey, golf, bowling, touch football, volleyball, softball, and billiards. The largest intramural sports event was the annual Field Day, with inter-class rivalry.

Leadership

Rectors
Rt. Rev. John Synnott (1897–1921)
Rev. Maurice F. McAuliffe (1921–1934)
Rev. Henry J. O'Brien (1934–1940)
Rev. Joseph M. Griffin (1940–1947)
Rt. Rev. Msgr. Raymond G. LaFontaine (1947–1954)
Rt. Rev. Msgr. John J. Byrnes (1954-1967)
Rev. James J. Conefrey (1967-1975)
Rev. John J. Kiely (1975-1980)
Rev. Charles B. Johnson (1980-1985)
Rev. Christie A. Macaluso (1985-1991)
Rev. Robert A. O'Grady (1991-1996)
Rev. Aidan N. Donahue (1996-2001)
Rev. Msgr. Gerard G. Schmitz (2001–2014)
Most Reverend Christie A. Macaluso (2014–present)

Bishops
(Arch) Bishops of Hartford since the seminary's founding 
Rt. Rev. Michael Tierney (1897–1908) [deceased], 
Rt. Rev. John J. Nilan (1910–1934) [deceased], 
Most Rev. Maurice F. McAuliffe (1934–1944) [deceased], 
Most Rev. Henry J. O'Brien (1945–1969) [deceased], 
Most Rev. John F. Whealon (1969–1991) [deceased], 
Most Rev. Daniel A. Cronin (1992-2003), 
Most Rev. Henry J. Mansell (2003–2013), 
Most Rev. Leonard P. Blair (2013–present)

Bishop alumni
Graduates of St. Thomas Seminary who went on to become Bishops:
†Most Reverend Francis P. Keough - Bishop of Providence (1934–1947); Archbishop of Baltimore (1948–1961)
†Most Reverend Henry J. O'Brien - Auxiliary Bishop of Hartford and Titular Bishop of Sita (1934–1945); Bishop of Hartford (1945–1953); Archbishop of Hartford (1953–1968)
†Most Reverend Matthew F. Brady - Bishop of Burlington (1938–1944); Bishop of Manchester (1944–1959)
Most Reverend Peter L. Gerety - Coadjutor Bishop of Portland (ME) (1966–1969); Bishop of Portland (ME) (1969–1974); Archbishop of Newark (1974–1986)
†Most Reverend Vincent J. Hines - Bishop of Norwich (1959–1975)
Most Reverend Robert E. Mulvee - Auxiliary Bishop of Manchester and Titular bishop of Summa (1977–1985); Bishop of Wilmington (1985–1995); Coadjutor Bishop of Providence (1995–1997); Bishop of Providence (1997–2005)
†Most Reverend Joseph F. Donnelly - Auxiliary Bishop of Hartford (1964–1977)
†Most Reverend John F. Hackett - Auxiliary Bishop of Hartford and Titular Bishop of Helenopolis in Palaestina  (1953–1986)
Most Reverend Peter A. Rosazza - Auxiliary Bishop emeritus of Hartford and Titular Bishop of Oppidum Novum (1978–2010)
†Most Reverend Ambrose Battista De Paoli - Auxiliary Bishop of Miami and Titular Bishop of Lares (1983–2007); Apostolic Pro-Nuncio to Sri Lanka (1983–1988); Apostolic Delegate to South Africa (1988–1997); Apostolic Pro-Nuncio to Lesotho (1988–1997); Apostolic Nunio to Swaziland (1993–1997); Apostolic Delegate to Namibia (1994–1997); Apostolic Nuncio to Botswana (1994–1997); Apostolic Nuncio to Japan (1997–2004); Apostolic Nuncio to Australia (2004–2007)
Most Reverend Paul S. Loverde - Auxiliary Bishop of Hartford (1988-1994); Bishop of Ogdensburg (1994-1999); Bishop of Arlington (1999–Present) 
Most Reverend Christie A. Macaluso - Auxiliary Bishop of Hartford and Titular Bishop of Grass Valley (1997–present)
Most Reverend Joseph K. Symons - Auxiliary Bishop of St. Petersburg and Titular Bishop of Sigus (1981-1983); Bishop of Pensacola-Tallahassee (1983-1990); Bishop of Palm Beach (1990-1998)

† = Deceased

Archdiocesan Center

Today, St. Thomas Seminary is known as The Archdiocesan Center at St. Thomas Seminary and serves as a Retreat and Conference Center for a variety of Roman Catholic and ecumenical, educational, and other groups. It also houses the Archbishop O'Brien Library which is open to the public and serves many Archdiocesan agencies.

In 2007, Archbishop Henry J. Mansell dedicated the Archbishop Daniel A. Cronin Residence for retired priests. a state of the art facility. The apartment suites were built in two of the four former dormitory halls of the Seminary.

The following are Archdiocesan agencies that are housed at the Archdiocesan Center at St. Thomas Seminary:

Archbishop's Annual Appeal
Black Catholics Ministries
Catholic Mutual Insurance Office
Catholic Transcript
FACS
Office of Catholic Schools
Charismatic Renewal
Diaconate and Diaconate Formation Offices  
Office for Divine Worship

Hispanic Evangelization
Metropolitan Tribunal
Mission Office
Office of Religious Education & Evangelization
Small Christian Communities
Vicar for Priests
Vocations Office
Coordinator for Campus Ministry
 
Information about The Archdiocesan Center is given on the archdiocesan website athttp://www.archdioceseofhartford.org

References

External links
Roman Catholic Archdiocese of Hartford

Catholic seminaries in the United States
Catholic universities and colleges in Connecticut
Universities and colleges in Hartford County, Connecticut
Buildings and structures in Hartford County, Connecticut
Educational institutions established in 1897
Catholic Church in Connecticut
Seminaries and theological colleges in Connecticut
1897 establishments in Connecticut